"1ère fois" is a song by French singer Imen Es featuring French rapper Alonzo. It was released on March 25, 2020.

Music video
As of November 2022, the music video for 1ère fois had over 117 million views on YouTube.

Charts

Certifications

References

2020 songs
2020 singles